Halichoeres chrysus, commonly called the canary wrasse, golden wrasse or yellow wrasse, is a fish species in the wrasse family native to central Indo-Pacific area.

Description
The canary wrasse is a small fish that can reach a maximum length of 12 cm. It has a thin, elongate body with a terminal mouth. Body coloration is bright yellow with a few variations according to age. Juvenile and immature female have two black spots rimmed with white or light yellow on the dorsal fin (the first one at the start of the fin (head side) and the second in the middle of its dorsal fin) and a third one between the caudal peduncle and the start of the caudal fin. Mature females or young males only show the two black spots on the dorsal fin. Mature males display only the first black spot on the front of the dorsal fin, a lighter-colored spot just behind the eye and irregular greenish to pinkish lines on the face.

Distribution and habitat
The canary wrasse is widespread throughout the tropical and subtropical waters of the central Indo-Pacific, in an area bordered by the Christmas Islands and Indonesia, Japan, New South Wales and the Rowley Shoals, and the Tonga Islands and Solomon Islands.

This wrasse occurs on outside reef slopes, in rubble and sandy areas from surface down to a depth of 30 meters.

Biology
The canary wrasse lives in small groups. It is a benthic predator that feeds mainly on small marine invertebrates such as crustaceans, molluscs, worms and echinoderms captured on or in the substrate.

Like most wrasse, the canary wrasse is a protogynous hermaphrodite, i.e. individuals start life as females with the capability of turning male later on.

Conservation status
The species is targeted but not thought to be threatened by the aquarium trade.

References

External links
 

chrysus
Taxa named by John Ernest Randall
Fish described in 1981